Drohndorf is a former municipality in the district of Salzlandkreis, in Saxony-Anhalt, Germany. Since 1 January 2008, it is part of the town Aschersleben.

See also
 Freckleben
 Mehringen

References

Former municipalities in Saxony-Anhalt
Aschersleben